Ritmo Ardiente is the twelfth album by Mexican star Laura León. It was released in 1984.

Track listing

 "El Que A Hierro Mata"
 "Hay Musica Y Romance"
 "Mi Maridito"
 "Luces De Mi Cumbia"
 "Yo No Soy Abusadora"
 "Su Majestad La Cumbia"
 "Un Poquito De Amor"
 "Tu Y Yo"
 "Amigo, Mi Dulce Amigo"
 "Amargo Y Dulce"

References

1984 albums
Laura León albums
Spanish-language albums